Mohammad Bashir (10 March 1935, in Lahore – 24 June 2001, in Lahore) was a wrestler from Pakistan, who won the bronze medal in freestyle wrestling in the welterweight class (73 kg) at the 1960 Summer Olympics in Rome. Bashir is the only Pakistani wrestler to become an Olympic medalist.

Bashir was a three-time gold medalist at the Commonwealth Games and also won four medals in the Asian Games. These were a gold at 1966 Bangkok, two silver medals at 1962 Jakarta, one in freestyle and the other in Greco-Roman style, in addition to a bronze medal in 1958 Tokyo.

His Commonwealth Games gold medals were earned at the 1958 (Cardiff), 1962 (Perth) and 1966 (Kingston) Commonwealth Games.

At the 1964 Summer Olympics in Tokyo, Mohammad Bashir competed in the lightweight class (70 kg) but only went up to the third round.

Mohammad Bashir received the Tamgha-i-Imtiaz medal in 1962 and the Pride of Performance Award in 1968 from the Government of Pakistan.

Olympic results

1960 Rome Summer Olympics

Men's welterweight (73 kg)
 1st round; Beat Peter Amey (GRB) by fall
 2nd round; Beat Juan Rolon (ARG) on pts
 3rd round; Lost to Goudarzi Emam Habibi (IRN) on pts
 4th round; Beat Karl Bruggmann (SWI) by fall
 5th round; Beat Gaetano De Vescovi (ITA) on pts
 Final round bout 1; Lost to İsmail Ogan (TUR) on pts
 Final round bout 3; Lost to Douglas Blubaugh (USA) by fall

Mohammad Bashir won the bronze medal after being ranked 3rd out of 23

1964 Tokyo Summer Olympics

Men's lightweight (70 kg)
 1st round; Beat Stefanos Ioannidis (GRE)
 2nd round; Lost to Zarbegi Beriashvili (USSR)
 3rd round; Lost to Mahmut Atalay (TUR) by fall

References

1935 births
2001 deaths
Wrestlers at the 1960 Summer Olympics
Wrestlers at the 1964 Summer Olympics
Pakistani male sport wrestlers
Olympic wrestlers of Pakistan
Olympic bronze medalists for Pakistan
Recipients of Tamgha-e-Imtiaz
Recipients of the Pride of Performance
Commonwealth Games gold medallists for Pakistan
Wrestlers at the 1958 British Empire and Commonwealth Games
Wrestlers at the 1962 British Empire and Commonwealth Games
Wrestlers at the 1966 British Empire and Commonwealth Games
Olympic medalists in wrestling
Asian Games medalists in wrestling
Wrestlers at the 1958 Asian Games
Wrestlers at the 1962 Asian Games
Wrestlers at the 1966 Asian Games
Medalists at the 1960 Summer Olympics
Commonwealth Games medallists in wrestling
Medalists at the 1958 Asian Games
Medalists at the 1962 Asian Games
Medalists at the 1966 Asian Games
Asian Games gold medalists for Pakistan
Asian Games silver medalists for Pakistan
Asian Games bronze medalists for Pakistan
Medallists at the 1958 British Empire and Commonwealth Games
Medallists at the 1962 British Empire and Commonwealth Games
Medallists at the 1966 British Empire and Commonwealth Games